Xerocrassa heraklea is a species of air-breathing land snail, a pulmonate gastropod mollusk in the family Geomitridae.

Distribution

This species is endemic to Greece, where it occurs in northern Crete, from Tombrouk, east of Iraklion, in the west to the Lasithi Plateau in the east.

See also
List of non-marine molluscs of Greece

References

 Bank, R. A.; Neubert, E. (2017). Checklist of the land and freshwater Gastropoda of Europe. Last update: July 16th, 2017.

Further reading

heraklea
Molluscs of Europe
Endemic fauna of Crete
Gastropods described in 2009